Godfrey Phillips India Ltd. (GPI) is a tobacco manufacturer headquartered in India. The firm was originally established in London in 1844. GPI was one of the first UK companies to mass-produce cigarettes, apart from being one of the founding companies of Imperial Tobacco along with John Player & Sons.

GPI manufactures and sells cigarettes, smoking tobacco and cigars, apart from having a non-tobacco line of products released in 2009 that include confectionery. GPI is the flagship company of Modi Enterprises.

The company had an annual turnover of approximately 2925.74 crores as of March 2021. The company also has business interests in pan masala, chewing and confectionery products. The company also manufactures and distributes Marlboro in India under a license agreement with Philip Morris International.

History
The house of Godfrey Phillips was established in 1844 at Bevis Marks in Aldgate, London, by cigar manufacturer Godfrey Phillips, who was the eldest son of Henry Phillips, born in the country fields outside London in October 1826. When his sons were old enough and working in the business, the firm's name was changed to Godfrey Phillips & Sons, Ltd.

On 21 August 1900 Godfrey Phillips died and in 1908 the partnership was sold, and Godfrey Phillips, Limited, was formed. The first directors were the partners- Joseph Phillips, chairman, Philip Phillips, David Phillips, Spencer Phillips and Arthur Phillips. Later, the business was listed on the London Stock Exchange as Godfrey Phillips Plc.

In 1936, Godfrey Phillips (India), Limited, was created; the building of native-style architecture was devoted to the manufacture of the group's brands Cavander's, De Reszke and Greys.

In 1967, Godfrey Phillips Ltd. of London made an arrangement with International Tobacco Co. who opened a factory in Northern India to manufacture on the company's behalf. Upon the merger of D. Macropolo & Co. Ltd., with the company, International Tobacco Co. Ltd. became a subsidiary of it.

In 1968, Philip Morris Inc. made a takeover bid for Godfrey Phillips Plc and the family shareholders were unable to prevent the company being sold.

Godfrey Phillips India has manufacturing facilities at Rabale in Navi Mumbai, and two units in Ghaziabad (near Delhi). They also have an R&D centre in Mumbai and a food R&D in Ghaziabad, and a tobacco-buying unit in Guntur (Andhra Pradesh).

Godfrey Phillips India has an International Business Division, for international export of its own cigarette brands, cut & blended tobacco, tobacco leaf and providing technical services and contract manufacturing.

Brands and products
GPI manufactures a variety of products related to tobacco through its subsidiary brands. Godfrey Phillips India also manufactures and distributes cigarette brand Marlboro under a license agreement with Philip Morris International Inc. Likewise, the company also has a non-tobacco range of products.

Notes

Trading cards
Godfrey Phillips Ltd. also produced a variety of cigarette cards to advertise their products, with several topics such as film actresses, animals, aircraft, famous people from history, among others. The first cards set was launched in 1904 and featured anonymous pin-up girls.

In the 1920s, the company took advantage of the rise popularity of association football trading cards in those times, releasing football collections in 1920, 1922 and 1923. Godfrey Phillips Ltd. issued a series of 1,100 football cards of the first collection, followed by 2,462 in 1922 and 940 in 1923.

The outbreak of the World War II caused a severe shortage of paper, and tobacco companies were forced to bring an end to the production of cigarette cards.

See also

 Modi Enterprises
 Association football trading card

References

External links

 
 Cigarette war in Calcutta – Godfrey Phillips alleges mop-up by rival distributors, The Telegraph
 GST Effect - Cigarettes firms slip on cess hike speculations

Manufacturing companies established in 1844
Tobacco companies of India
Manufacturing companies based in Delhi
Indian cigarette brands
Companies listed on the Bombay Stock Exchange
Companies listed on the National Stock Exchange of India
Modi Enterprises
Indian companies established in 1936
Indian companies established in 1844